Coleophora lassella is a moth of the family Coleophoridae found in Europe.

Description
There are possibly two generations per year in western Europe, with adults on wing from late May to June and again in mid-August.

The larvae feed on toad rush (Juncus bufonius). The case is made from a seed capsule and the larvae consume the contents of a capsule before attaching to another one to feed.

Distribution
The moth is widespread in Europe including Belgium, the Canary Islands, Corsica, Crete, Cyprus, Denmark, Finland, France, Germany, Great Britain, Greece, Ireland, Italy, Latvia, Norway, Poland, Portugal, southern Russia, Sardinia, Sicily, Spain, Sweden and the Netherlands.

References

External links
 Bestimmungshilfe für die in Europa nachgewiesenen Schmetterlingsarten

lassella
Moths described in 1859
Moths of Europe
Taxa named by Otto Staudinger